1729 Beryl, provisional designation , is a stony background asteroid from the Florian region in the inner asteroid belt, approximately  in diameter. It was discovered on 19 September 1963, by astronomers at Indiana University during the Indiana Asteroid Program at Goethe Link Observatory in Indiana, United States. The S-type asteroid has a rotation period of 4.9 hours. It was named for Beryl H. Potter, a long-time research assistant of the discovering program.

Orbit and classification 

Beryl is a non-family asteroid of the main belt's background population when applying the hierarchical clustering method to its proper orbital elements. Based on osculating Keplerian orbital elements, the asteroid has also been classified as a member of the Flora family, a giant asteroid family and the largest family of stony asteroids in the main-belt. It orbits the Sun in the inner asteroid belt at a distance of 2.0–2.5 AU once every 3 years and 4 months (1,216 days; semi-major axis of 2.23 AU). Its orbit has an eccentricity of 0.10 and an inclination of 2° with respect to the ecliptic.

Naming 

This minor planet was named after Beryl H. Potter (1900–1985), research assistant at the Indiana University, who participated in the program of minor planet observations from 1949 to 1966. During this period, she analysed nearly 6,300 photographic plates, measuring the positions of minor planets and reporting lost asteroids to the International Astronomical Union, which were then published in the Minor Planet Circulars. The official  was published by the Minor Planet Center on 15 July 1968.

Physical characteristics 

In the SMASS classification, Beryl is a common, stony S-type asteroid.

Rotation period 

In May 2009, a rotational lightcurve of Beryl was obtained from photometric observations by Julian Oey at the Leura  and Kingsgrove  observatories in Australia. Lightcurve analysis gave a rotation period of  hours and a brightness variation of 0.20 magnitude. In addition, a nearly identical period of  hours with an amplitude of 0.14 was determined in the R-band by astronomers at the Palomar Transient Factory in October 2010.

Diameter and albedo 

According to the survey carried out by the NEOWISE mission of NASA's Wide-field Infrared Survey Explorer, Beryl measures 9.04 kilometers in diameter and its surface has an albedo of 0.246. The Collaborative Asteroid Lightcurve Link assumes an albedo of 0.24 – derived from 8 Flora, the namesake of the Flora Family – and calculates a diameter of 8.58 kilometers based on an absolute magnitude of 12.5.

References

External links 
 Asteroid Lightcurve Database (LCDB), query form (info )
 Dictionary of Minor Planet Names, Google books
 Discovery Circumstances: Numbered Minor Planets (1)-(5000) – Minor Planet Center
 
 

001729
001729
Named minor planets
001729
19630919